Calvin Smith Jr. (born December 10, 1987) is an American athlete who specialises in the 200m and  400m. He is the son of former world record-holder, world champion, Olympic medalist and National Track & Field Hall of Famer, Calvin Smith Sr. He is an All-American for University of Florida. He's earned 18 All-America titles, the most in University of Florida track and field history. He was also a part of the 2010 NCAA indoor national championship team and was an alternate in the 2008 Beijing Olympic Games on the United States 4x400 relay although he did not compete.

He won gold medals in the relay at three consecutive World Indoor Championships starting in 2012.

References

External links
 
 
 
 

1987 births
Living people
American male sprinters
Florida Gators men's track and field athletes
World Athletics indoor record holders (relay)
African-American male track and field athletes
World Athletics Indoor Championships winners
21st-century African-American sportspeople
20th-century African-American people